The Institute of European Studies is a unit of the Jagiellonian University, having its roots in the Inter-Faculty Department for European Studies which was founded in 1993. It was the first university Institute in Poland committed to the study of European integration.

The primary seat of the Institute is ul. Romana Ingardena 3, 30-060, with a smaller Centre for European Studies on ul Garbarska in the city centre.

The JU Institute of European Studies is a partner institution of the Europaeum.

Structure 

 Centre for European Culture and Society
 Centre for European Heritage
 Centre for European Philosophy
 Centre for the EU Political System
 Department of Central European History and Culture
 Department of European History
 Department of the EU Financial System
 Central and Eastern European Studies
 European Consultation Centre

The Institute is closely connected with the JU Centre for Holocaust Studies and shares one seat with the Centre. The Centre for Holocaust Studies is the only university institution in Kraków committed to the study of the Holocaust. Before the Centre was established, Holocaust Studies Department was a part of the Institute of European Studies.

The Centre cooperates with main Holocaust Studies institutions in the world, including Yad Vashem and the Auschwitz-Birkenau concentration camp. International Summer School "Teaching the Holocaust" is organised in cooperation with the American Jewish University.

Study programmes 

The Institute conducts a wide range of study programmes in Polish and in English, including MA programmes in European Studies, European Governance, Euroculture or Economy, State and Society, many of them organised in cooperation with foreign partner institutions.

Press 

 Forum Europejskie [The European Forum]
 Problemy Współczesnego Prawa Międzynarodowego, Europejskiego i Porównawczego [The Problems of Contemporary International, European and Comparative Law]

Research Projects 

RECON – Reconstituting Democracy in Europe
Why should we teach about the Holocaust?
La place, un patrymoine européen
European Curriculum for Children of Migrant Workers
Website Guide to Tolerance Education  
Migracja wahadłowa a procesy europeizacji i konstruowania tożsamości europejskiej
Nauczanie o Holokauście – Szkoła Letnia dla Nauczycieli
Erasmus Mundus Masters Courses and Scholarships
Completed research projects include: Multicultural Europe, Socrates-Comenius NIKE, Transnational identities – cities unbound – migrations redefined.

Main research tasks of the Centre for Holocaust Studies are: studies in post-Holocaust symbolic representations; mutated memories of Holocaust as a social process; studies in Holocaust tourism and pilgrimages; sociology of murderers, bystanders, helpers and collaborators; Holocaust museums studies; legal dimension of the Holocaust exterminations .

See also 
 European Studies

External links 
 Institute’s website
 Centre for European Studies
 IMESS Programme
 Euroculture Programme
 IMPREST Programme
 EuroCourses
 Students’ Academic Circle
 Institute’s Location

Institute of European Studies
Universities and colleges in Poland
Education in Kraków
European studies
Holocaust studies